Kyiv Music Fest, is an annual international music festival in Kyiv, Ukraine that profiles modern Ukrainian classical music aiming to promote Ukrainian musicians in the context of world art. The co-founders of the state-funded festival are the Ministry of Culture of Ukraine and the National Union of Composers of Ukraine.

The festival is held annually in late September to early October. The program of the festival consists works of modern Ukrainian and foreign composers, solo artists and music groups performing.

About 
The main venues of the festival include National Opera of Ukraine, National Music Conservatory of Ukraine, National Organ and Chamber Music Hall of Ukraine (St. Nicholas Cathedral), National Philharmonic of Ukraine, Kyiv House of Scientists of the National Academy of Sciences of Ukraine.

History 

The festival was held in 1990. It was the brainchild of prominent Ukrainian composer Ivan Karabyts who was the festival's musical director from 1990 to 2001. He was followed by Myroslav Skoryk who served as music director from 2002 to 2005 and again from 2013 to 2019, Ivan Nebesnyy from 2006 to 2012 and Ihor Shcherbakov since 2020.

Festival programs 

 I International Festival Kyiv Music Fest '90 (6–13 October 1990) — Program
 II International Festival Kyiv Music Fest '91 (5–12 October 1991) — Program
 III International Festival Kyiv Music Fest '92 (3–10 October 1992) — Program
 IV International Festival Kyiv Music Fest '93 (2–9 October 1993) — Program
 V International Festival Kyiv Music Fest '94 (1–8 October 1994) — Program
 VI International Festival Kyiv Music Fest '95 (September 30 — October 7, 1995) — Program
 VII * International Festival Kyiv Music Fest '96 (27 September — 5 October 1996) — Program
 VIII International Festival Kyiv Music Fest '97 (September 27 — October 4, 1997) — Program
 IX International Festival Kyiv Music Fest '98 (27 September — 3 October 1998) — Program
 X International Festival Kyiv Music Fest '99 (25 September — 2 October 1999) — Program
 XI International Festival Kyiv Music Fest-2000 (23–30 September 2000) — Program
 XII International Festival Kyiv Music Fest-2001 (September 22 — October 1, 2001) — Program
 XIII International Festival Kyiv Music Fest-2002(21–29 September 2002) — Program
 XIV International Festival Kyiv Music Fest-2003 (September 27 — October 4, 2003) — Program
 XV International Festival Kyiv Music Fest-2004
 XVI International Festival Kyiv Music Fest-2005 (September 24 — October 2, 2005)
 XVII International Festival Kyiv Music Fest-2006 — Program
 XVIII International Festival Kyiv Music Fest-2007 (September 28 — October 7, 2007) — Program
 XIX International Festival Kyiv Music Fest-2008 (September 27 — October 5, 2008) — Program
 XX International Festival Kyiv Music Fest-2009 (September 25 — October 4, 2009) — Program
 XXI International Festival Kyiv Music Fest-2010 (September 25 — October 3, 2010) — Program
 XXII International Festival Kyiv Music Fest-2011 (September 24 — October 2, 2011) — Program
 XXIII International Festival Kyiv Music Fest-2012 (September 27 — October 8, 2012) — Program
 XXIV International Festival Kyiv Music Fest-2013 (September 26  — October 6, 2013) — Program
 XXV International Festival Kyiv Music Fest-2014 (September 24  — October 5, 2014) — Program
 XXVI International Festival Kyiv Music Fest-2015 (September 26  — October 4, 2015) — Program
 XXVII International Festival Kyiv Music Fest-2016 (October 1  — October 9, 2016) — Program
 XXVIII International Festival Kyiv Music Fest—2017 (September 30 — October 8, 2017) Program
 XXIX International Festival Kyiv Music Fest-2018 (September 29 — October 8, 2018) Program Program
XXX International Festival Kyiv Music Fest-2019 (September 27 — October 7, 2019)  Program
XXXI International Festival Kyiv Music Fest-2020 (September 26 — October 4, 2020) Program

Festival venues 

Festival concerts are held in architecturally significant venues in the center of Kyiv, including:

 National Opera of Ukraine
 Lysenko Column Hall of the National Philharmonic of Ukraine
 Great and Small Halls of the Kyiv Conservatory
 National Organ and Chamber Music Hall of Ukraine (St. Nicholas Roman Catholic Cathedral)
 Kyiv House of Scientists of the National Academy of Sciences of Ukraine

See also 
Kontrasty
Premieres of the Season (Musical Festival)

Notes and references 

Music in Kyiv
Classical music festivals in Ukraine
Annual events in Ukraine
Music festivals in Ukraine
Music festivals established in 1990
Autumn events in Ukraine